William Dodds (born 1885; date of death unknown) was an English footballer who played at inside-right for Southwick, Burslem Port Vale, Oldham Athletic, and Linfield.

Career
Dodds played for Southwick, before joining Burslem Port Vale in June 1906. He scored on his debut in a 2–1 defeat to Leicester Fosse at the Athletic Ground on 1 September. He played in 42 games that season, bagging 14 goals in the process. However, in the summer of 1907 the club went into financial meltdown and were forced to release all of its players. Dodds moved on to Oldham Athletic, and later played for Linfield.

Career statistics
Source:

References

1885 births
Year of death missing
Footballers from Sunderland
English footballers
Association football forwards
Southwick F.C. players
Port Vale F.C. players
Oldham Athletic A.F.C. players
Linfield F.C. players
English Football League players